A list of films produced in Turkey and in the Turkish language in alphabetical order. For a list of films by year see List of Turkish films for guidance.

1–9

A

B

C

D

E

F

G

H

I

J

K

L

M

N

O

P

R

S

T

U

V

Y

Z

External links
 Turkish films at the Internet Movie Database